The 1927 season of the Mitropa Cup football club tournament was won by Sparta Prague in a final against Rapid Wien. This was the inaugural edition of the tournament.

Quarter-finals

|}

First leg

Second leg

MTK won 8–2 on aggregate.

Rapid Wien won 9–1 on aggregate.

Sparta Prague won 8–6 on aggregate.

Slavia Prague won 6–2 on aggregate.

Semi-finals

|}

First leg

Second leg

Sparta Prague was awarded win after MTK fielded an ineligible player.

Rapid Wein won 4–3 on aggregate.

Final

|}

First leg

Second leg

Top goalscorers

Source:

References

External links 
 Mitropa Cup results at Rec.Sport.Soccer Statistics Foundation

1927
1927–28 in European football
1927–28 in Austrian football
1927–28 in Yugoslav football
1927–28 in Czechoslovak football
1927–28 in Hungarian football